Herbert Robert McKnight (1 December 1883 – 1 May 1961) was an Australian rules footballer who played for the Collingwood Football Club in the Victorian Football League (VFL).

Notes

External links 
	
 	
Bert McKnight's profile at Collingwood Forever

1883 births
1961 deaths
Australian rules footballers from Victoria (Australia)
Collingwood Football Club players